The Last Frontier is a 1986 American-Australian television miniseries starring Linda Evans, Jack Thompson and Jason Robards.

Plot
Kate Adamson (Linda Evans) is a struggling single mother from Los Angeles.  She meets and falls in love with Australian cattle station owner Tom Hannon (Tony Bonner) who is visiting America on business.  The couple marry after a whirlwind two week courtship.  Tom leaves for Australia and Kate agrees to follow a week later.  Her two children Tina and Marty are unenthusiastic about the move but are convinced by their mother to come along.

They arrive in the Northern Territory but Tom is not there to meet them.  Unaware that Tom has been killed in a plane crash on the way home from California, they make their way to Larapinta, Tom's cattle station near Alice Springs.  Their arrival comes as a shock to Tom's two young daughters Zoe and Emma who were not told of Tom's marriage (he wanted it to be a surprise).   Kate considers leaving but realizing that she has no money for a return trip she resolves to stay despite a desperate drought.

She is soon visited by Ed Stenning (Jason Robards) and his daughter Meg (Judy Morris).  Ed Stennings is a local land baron and the owner of Cutta Cutta, a huge station that borders Larapinta.  Stenning wants to incorporate Larapinta into his holdings and tries to force Kate to sell.  Her children want to sell and return to California but Tom's daughters insist that they stay on and keep the station going.  Kate also begins a relationship with Nick Stenning, Ed's estranged son.

Larapinta's primary water bore runs dry and Kate must drill a new one or the cattle will die.  Shortly after the new bore is drilled it is sabotaged.  Marty sees Ed at the site of the explosion holding a stick of dynamite and Kate files charges against him.  At the trial Ed collapses and it becomes apparent that he is dying.  Ed and Nick reconcile and Nick soon realizes that it was Meg who blew up the bore. 
 
Nick's reconciliation with Ed causes a break with Kate.   Kate eventually realizes that Meg was responsible for the bore and Kate confronts Meg. Nick and Kate reconcile.

Cast
Linda Evans - Kate Hannon
Jack Thompson - Nick Stenning
Peter Billingsley – Marty Adamson
Meredith Salenger - Tina Adamson
Jason Robards – Ed Stenning
Judy Morris - Meg Stenning
Beth Buchanan - Zoe Hannon
Asher Keddie - Emma Hannon
Tony Bonner – Tom Hannon
John Ewart - Henry Dingwell
Leslie Dayman - Bowman

Production
The miniseries was filmed on location the outback of the Northern Territory, and South Australia except for the Los Angeles scenes which were filmed in that city. The fictional Larapinta and Cutta Cutta stations were filmed on outback locations.  The name of Larapinta is derived from an aboriginal word that means “salty river” while Cutta Cutta means “many stars”. The cast included a mix of American and Australian actors.

References

External links 
 

1980s Australian television miniseries
1986 Australian television series debuts
1986 Australian television series endings
1980s American television miniseries
Hanna-Barbera films
Films directed by Simon Wincer
Television shows set in the Northern Territory
English-language television shows